Camborne-Redruth was an urban district in Cornwall, England, from 1934 to 1974. It was formed as a merger of Camborne and Redruth urban districts along with parts of Redruth Rural District and Helston Rural District (both of which were being abolished). The towns are about four miles apart and form a loose conurbation.

The urban district persisted until it was merged into the Kerrier district of Cornwall under the Local Government Act 1972.

Civil parishes
The civil parishes within the district were:
 Camborne
 Carharrack
 Carn Brea
 Illogan
 Lanner
 Portreath
 Redruth
 St Day

See also

Camborne and Redruth (UK Parliament constituency)

References

Districts of England abolished by the Local Government Act 1972
History of Cornwall
Politics of Cornwall
Local government in Cornwall
Urban districts of England
1934 establishments in England
Camborne
Redruth